The Slavey (also Slave and South Slavey) are a First Nations indigenous peoples of the Dene group, indigenous to the Great Slave Lake region, in Canada's Northwest Territories, and extending into northeastern British Columbia and northwestern Alberta.

Name

Cree exonym "slave"
Slavey or just Slave is a translation of the name given to Dene by the Cree "who sometimes raided and enslaved their less aggressive northern neighbors". The names of the Slave River, Lesser Slave River, Great Slave Lake, and Lesser Slave Lake all derive from this Cree name. Esclaves remains incorporated in the French names of these geographical features, since the French traded with the Cree before the English did. The people now called Slavey in English were not necessarily taken as slaves in that period.

Dehcho autonym
The name Slavey is seldom used by the people themselves, who call themselves Dene. Indigenous ethnonyms for South Slavey people and language are Dehcho, Deh Cho Dene ("Mackenzie River People") or Dene Tha.

Though most Athabaskan peoples call themselves Dene, those in the Northwest Territories tend to use it for their particular group specifically. However, the northern Slavey are also known in English as the Sahtú, while the southern band are known as the Deh Cho.

Groups 
The South Slavey live in northwestern Alberta, northeastern British Columbia, and the southern Northwest Territories. First Nations of South Slavey people: 
The Fort Nelson First Nation in British Columbia. Own name: Dene "the people", for language Dene k'e. Historical literature Fort Nelson Indian Band, Fort Nelson Slavey Band, Fort Nelson Indians.
The Dene Tha' First Nation in Alberta. Own name: for people Dene Tha or Dene Dháa «ordinary people», for language Dene Dháh. Historical literature by a number of names, including the following: Upper Hay River Band; Hay Lake(s) Band; Hay River Indians; Slave Band; Slavey Indians at Hay Lake(s); Upper Hay River Post Indians; and Bistcho Lake Tribe.
The Dehcho First Nations (also called Deh Cho Dene – "Mackenzie River Dene") in the Northwest Territories: 
Acho Dene Koe First Nation – Fort Liard (Ahcho Koe or Ahcho Kue)
Deh Gah Gotie Dene Council – Fort Providence (Zhahti Koe or Zhahti Kue)
Jean Marie River First Nation (Tthe'K'ehdeli Dene) – Jean Marie River (Tthek'éhdélį or Tthek'edeli)
Katl'odeeche First Nation (Kátłʼodehche Dene) – Hay River (Xátł'odehchee) with Hay River Reserve
Ka'agee Tu First Nation (Ka'agee Tu Dene) – Kakisa (K'ágee)
Liidli Kue First Nation (Liidli Kue Dene) – Fort Simpson (Liidli Kue)
Nahanni Butte Dene Band (N'ah adehe Dene) – Nahanni Butte (Tthenáágó)
Pehdzeh Ki First Nation (Pehdzeh Ki Dene) – Wrigley (Pehdzeh Ki)
Sambaa Kʼe (Trout Lake) Dene (Sambaa K'e Dene) – Trout Lake (Sambaa Kʼe)
West Point First Nation – West Point (Ts'ueh Nda – Spruce Point)

The Sahtu, Sahtu Dene ("Great Bear Lake People") or North Slavey people live exclusively in the Northwest Territories.  They speak the North Slavey language.

The Navajo people (Diné) of the Four Corners region of the Southwestern United States are said to be descended from the Nahani, who lived where the Nahanni National Park Reserve is, and also the Slavey of Northern Canada.

In popular culture
Most residents of Lynx River, the fictional town in which CBC drama North of 60 is set, are Slavey. Though the word itself is seldom mentioned in dialogue (band members generally identifying themselves as Dene), the town is located in Slavey territory and on one occasion a character proposes a toast before the assembled members in the Slavey language.

See also
 Slavey Jargon (Broken Slavey)

References

Further reading
 Asch, Michael. Slavey Indians. S.l: s.n, 1978.

External links
 Map of Northwest Coast First Nations  (including South Slavey (Dene-Tha)
 MNSU Slavey page
 An account of interactions between Slaveys and George Hunter
 

Dene peoples